Chilliwack is the first album by the Canadian rock band Chilliwack, released in June 1970.  Chilliwack was a continuation of the psychedelic-progressive group The Collectors, except without lead singer Howie Vickers.

Track listing
"Sundown" (Henderson, Lawrence) (5:37)
"Every Day" (Lawrence) (3:41)
"Seventeenth Summer" (Ryga, Henderson, Lawrence, Miller, Vickberg, Turney) (6:02)
"Ballad" (Henderson) (4:57)
"I've Got You Fixed" (Miller) (3:46)
"Rain-O" (Henderson) (6:46)
"Chain Train" (Lawrence) (7:07)

Singles
"Chain Train" (Lawrence) (3:04)
Stereo Single Mix
Released as Parrot single PAR 350
B-Side: "Osaka"
Mono Single Mix
Released as Parrot single 45-350
DJ Promo only
B-Side: "I Must Have Been Blind"
"Rain-O" (Henderson) (3:03)
Single Version
Released as Parrot single PAR 2535
B-Side: "I've Got You Fixed"
"Every Day" (Lawrence) (2:54)
Single Version
Released as Parrot single PAR 2536
B-Side: "Sundown"
"Sundown" (Henderson/Lawrence) (3:24)
Single Version
B-Side of "Every Day" Single
"I Must Have Been Blind" (Lawrence/Turney/Miller/Henderson) (3:10)
B-Side of "Chain Train" DJ promo single
Previously released in stereo by The Collectors as London single M-17379 in January 1970
"Osaka" (Miller) (2:23)
B-Side of "Chain Train" Stereo single

Personnel
Chilliwack
Bill Henderson - guitar, piano, vocals
Claire Lawrence - flute, piano, organ, saxophone, vocals
Ross Turney - drums
Glenn Miller - bass, guitar

1970 debut albums
Chilliwack (band) albums
Parrot Records albums
London Records albums
Albums produced by Claire Lawrence
Albums produced by Bill Henderson (Canadian singer)